Cernay may refer to several communes in France:

Cernay, Calvados, in the Calvados département 
Cernay, Eure-et-Loir, in the Eure-et-Loir département 
Cernay, Haut-Rhin, in the Haut-Rhin département 
Cernay, Vienne, in the Vienne département
Cernay-en-Dormois, in the Marne département 
Cernay-la-Ville, in the Yvelines département, a suburb of Paris
Cernay-l'Église, in the Doubs département 
Cernay-lès-Reims, in the Marne département